The 2021–22 Bahraini Premier League (also known as Nasser Bin Hamad Premier League for sponsorship reasons), was the 65th top-level football season in Bahrain. The season started on 25 August 2021 and ended on 16 May 2022.

Team location

League table

Results

Relegation play-offs
In this edition of the relegation play-offs, the eighth and ninth-placed teams of the Bahraini Premier League were joined by the third and fourth-placed teams of the 2021–22 Bahraini Second Division in a four-team group stage where each team played each other once. The top three teams of the group qualified for the 2022–23 edition of the Bahraini Premier League and the bottom team qualified for the 2022–23 edition of the Bahraini Second Division. The relegation play-offs started on 6 May and ended on 16 May 2022.

Table

Results

Season statistics

Top scorers

References

Bahraini Premier League seasons
Bahrain